Underage is a 2023 Philippine television drama series broadcast by GMA Network. The series is an adaptation of the 1980 film of the same title by Regal Films. Directed by Rechie Del Carmen, it stars Lexi Gonzales, Elijah Alejo, and Hailey Mendes. It premiered on January 16, 2023 on the network's Afternoon Prime line up replacing Nakarehas na Puso.

Cast and characters 
Lead cast
Lexi Gonzales as Celina "Celine" Serrano / Celina "Celine" Gatchalian
Hailey Mendes as Carina  "Carrie" Serrano / Carina "Carrie" Siguenza
Elijah Alejo as Serena "Chynna" Serrano

Supporting cast
Sunshine Cruz as Maria Elena "Lena" Serrano / Maria Elena "Lena" Gatchalian / Maria Elena "Lena" Siguenza
Snooky Serna as Velda Alcantara-Gatchalian (formerly Guerrero) 
Gil Cuerva as Lancer "Lance" A. Guerrero
Vince Crisostomo as Christopher "Tope" Miranda
Christian Vasquez as Dominic Gatchalian
Yayo Aguila as Rebecca "Becca" Serrano
Jean Saburit as Ylvira Gatchalian
Jome Silayan as Enrico "Rico" Siguenza
Maey Bautista as Remicia "Remi"

 Guest cast
Smokey Manaloto as Delfin Serrano 
Nikki Co as Leonardo "Leo" A. Guerrero
Anjay Anson as Lester
Chrome Prince Cosio as Officer Philip Castro
John Philip Koch as Officer Abalante
Angelito Galang as Gelo
Jalyn Perez as TV Reporter
Michael Brian as Lorenzo
Lotlot Bustamante as Lourdes
Sharmaine Suarez as Darla
Eliza Sarmiento as Elsa
Judie dela Cruz as Meggy

Production 
Principal photography commenced in September 2022.

Episodes
<onlyinclude>

References

External links
 
 

2023 Philippine television series debuts
Filipino-language television shows
GMA Network drama series
Live action television shows based on films
Television shows set in the Philippines